Sir Henry Vere Huntley (1795 – 7 May 1864) was an English naval officer and colonial administrator. He was the eleventh Governor of Prince Edward Island.

From 1840 to 1841, he was the Lieutenant Governor of The Gambia. From 1841 to 1847, he was governor of Prince Edward Island.

See also

References

1795 births
1864 deaths
Royal Navy officers
Governors of the Gambia
Lieutenant Governors of the Colony of Prince Edward Island